Michael Peter Epstein (born April 4, 1943), nicknamed "Superjew", is an American former professional baseball player for the Baltimore Orioles, Washington Senators / Texas Rangers, Oakland Athletics, and California Angels of Major League Baseball (MLB).

Early and personal life
Epstein was born in the Bronx, New York, and is Jewish. His parents were Jack (a salesman, born in Toronto, Canada) and Evelyn (born in New York City). When he was three years old, his family moved to Hartsdale, New York, and then when he was 13 to Fairfax in Los Angeles, California. Epstein said of his father, who refused when Epstein was still a minor to sign a contract on his behalf with the Dodgers: "He wanted me to be a lawyer, rather than a bum."

Amateur career
Epstein played for the baseball and football teams while attending Fairfax High School in Los Angeles, graduating in 1961.

Epstein attended the University of California-Berkeley, where he majored in social psychology and played college baseball for the California Golden Bears. He graduated in 1964.  Although his .375 batting average in 1963 led to a contract offer by the Los Angeles Dodgers, he decided to finish college. The following year, he batted .384 as a senior and was named an All-American. He represented the United States in baseball at the 1964 Summer Olympics as a demonstration sport in Tokyo.

Minor leagues
Epstein played for the Stockton Ports of the California League in 1965, and led the league in batting average (.338) and home runs (30; tying a league record set by Vince DiMaggio).  He was named the league's most valuable player (MVP). Rival manager Rocky Bridges nicknamed him "Superjew" for his efforts that season.

Epstein played for the Rochester Red Wings of the International League in 1966, batting .309 with 29 home runs and 102 runs batted in (RBIs), earning him league MVP and Rookie of the Year honors. He was also named an All Star and received The Sporting News Minor League Player of the Year Award and Topps Minor League Player of the Year Award.

Major leagues
After the Orioles tried in vain to convert him to the outfield (they already had Boog Powell at first base), they demoted him to Rochester again. The outspoken Epstein refused to report, going home to California instead. He was traded in May 1967 with Frank Bertaina to the Washington Senators for Pete Richert. Later that season, in his first at-bat against the Orioles, Epstein hit a grand slam. In  he was 4th in the league in HBP (9).

In  with the Senators, in only 403 at bats Epstein hit 30 home runs (ninth in the American League), had 85 runs batted in (RBIs), and hit for a .278 batting average (and .347 with runners in scoring position) with an excellent .414 on-base percentage and .551 slugging percentage.  He was fourth in the league in hit by pitch (10), and he hit a home run every 13.4 at bats. He was 25th in voting for the American League MVP.  This was also the only year in which the reconstituted Senators finished above .500.

In 1970 he was second in the league in being hit by a pitch (13), while hitting 20 home runs, and leading all AL first basemen in range factor (10.08).

In May 1971 he was traded along with Darold Knowles to the Oakland Athletics for Frank Fernandez, Don Mincher, Paul Lindblad, and cash. In 1971, while hitting 18 home runs in 329 at bats, he was hit by a pitch 12 times, leading the league. In  he hit 26 home runs (3rd in the league) for the world champion Athletics.  He hit a home run every 17.5 at bats (3rd in the AL), had a .490 slugging percentage (5th), a .376 on-base percentage (6th), 62 walks (10th), and was hit by a pitch 11 times (2nd).  He was 16th in voting for the American League MVP.

Going hitless in 16 at bats during the World Series in addition to his feud with manager Dick Williams over lack of playing time resulted in the Athletics fulfilling his trade demand by sending him to the Texas Rangers for Horacio Piña on December 1, 1972. Additionally the A's wanted to free up the first base position for Gene Tenace who was the star of that same Fall Classic.

Opening  batting .188 with one homer and six RBI, he was dealt along with Rich Hand and Rick Stelmaszek from the Rangers to the California Angels for Jim Spencer and Lloyd Allen on May 20. In 1973 he was seventh in the league in hit by pitch (8). On May 4, he was released by the Angels.

In 907 games over nine seasons, Epstein posted a .244 batting average (695-for-2854) with 362 runs, 130 home runs, 380 RBI, 448 bases on balls, .358 on-base percentage and .424 slugging percentage. He finished his career with a .991 fielding percentage playing every inning at first base. In 13 postseason games, he hit only .108 (4-for-37) with two runs scored, one home run, one RBI and nine walks.

In 1991 he was inducted into the Southern California Jewish Sports Hall of Fame. He was inducted as a member of the United States National Jewish Sports Hall of Fame in 2004.

Through 2010, he was sixth all-time in career home runs (behind Mike Lieberthal) among Jewish major league baseball players.

After baseball
In 2007, Epstein began a hitting school. His "rotational hitting" instruction has been used around the country, particularly on the West Coast.

See also
List of select Jewish baseball players
List of University of California, Berkeley alumni

References

External links
, or Baseball Reference (Minors), or Retrosheet or Mike Epstein Baseballbiography.com , or Venezuelan Winter League, or "A kosher look at Judaism in baseball", 4/2/07

1943 births
Living people
Baltimore Orioles players
Buffalo Bisons (minor league) players
California Angels players
California Golden Bears baseball players
Fairfax High School (Los Angeles) alumni
Florida Instructional League Orioles players
International League MVP award winners
Jewish American baseball managers
Jewish American baseball players
Jewish Major League Baseball players
Major League Baseball first basemen
Minor league baseball managers
Oakland Athletics players
Rochester Red Wings players
Sportspeople from the Bronx
Baseball players from New York City
Baseball players from Los Angeles
People from Fairfax, California
People from Hartsdale, New York
Stockton Ports players
Texas Rangers players
Tiburones de La Guaira players
American expatriate baseball players in Venezuela
Washington Senators (1961–1971) players
Baseball players at the 1964 Summer Olympics
21st-century American Jews